CEY may refer to:

 Cononley railway station, England National Rail station code CEY
 Murray-Calloway County Airport, Murray, Kentucky, IATA airport code CEY
 Ron Cey, a former Major League Baseball player
 Sri Lanka, formerly known as Ceylon
 Strand, Western Cape, by vehicle registration code